These are the official results of the men's decathlon competition at the 2003 World Championships in Athletics in Paris, France. With 20 participating athletes, including eight non-finishers, the competition is notable for having the lowest number of competitors in the World Championships history. The competition started on Monday 26 August 2003 and ended on Tuesday 27 August 2003.

Medalists

Schedule

Monday, 26 August

Tuesday, 27 August

Records

Results

See also
 2002 European Athletics Championships – Men's decathlon
 2003 Decathlon Year Ranking
 2003 Hypo-Meeting
 Athletics at the 2003 Pan American Games – Men's decathlon
 Athletics at the 2003 Summer Universiade – Men's decathlon
 Athletics at the 2004 Summer Olympics – Men's decathlon

References
 Results

D
Decathlon at the World Athletics Championships